Robert Bird Group (RBG), established in 1982, is an Australian global consulting engineering firm. RBG became a member of the Surbana Jurong Group in late 2017.

Services 
Robert Bird Group provides structural engineering, civil engineering, construction engineering (temporary works), geotechnical engineering (UK & Middle East), and virtual design and construction services.

Major projects

Australia

 400 George Street
 AAMI Stadium
 Australia108
 Crown Sydney
 Salesforce Tower
 Victoria One
 Eq. Tower
 Riparian Plaza
 600 Collins Street 
 The Tower, One St George Wharf
 Chapel Tower
 The Oracle Beach Tower
 One Central Park
 35 Spring Street

United Kingdom

 100 Bishopsgate
 Spire London
 The Tower, One St George Wharf
 70 Gracechurch Street
 Elizabeth House
 One The Elephant
 Trafalgar Place
 Phoenix

Middle East & Northern Africa
 ICD Brookfield Place

South-East Asia
 Merdeka PNB118

References 

Engineering consulting firms of Australia
International engineering consulting firms